MMDA may refer to:
 Madras Metropolitan Development Authority, former name of Chennai Metropolitan Development Authority
 Metropolitan Manila Development Authority
 MMDA (drug) (3-methoxy-4,5-methylenedioxyamphetamine), a psychedelic drug
 Money Market Deposit Account, also known as Money Market Account
 Metropolitan, municipal and district authority, a collective term to describe the local administrative divisions of Ghana. See Districts of Ghana.